Persecution of Christians in the post–Cold War era refers to the persecution of Christians from 1989 to the present. Part of a global problem of religious persecution, persecution of Christians in this era is taking place in Africa, the Americas, Europe, Asia and Middle East.

Anti-Christian persecutions 
A July 2019 report, in support of persecuted Christians, released by the UK's Secretary of State for Foreign and Commonwealth Affairs, states that the number of countries where Christians suffer because of their faith, rose from 125 in 2015 to 144 in 2016. The review prepared by the Bishop of Truro, states that in some regions the level and nature of persecution, is arguably coming close to meeting the International definition of genocide, according to the Genocide Convention, adopted by the United Nations. 

Between 2007 and 2017, the PEW organization found that "Christians experienced harassment by governments or social groups in 144 countries." The United States submits an annual report on religious freedom to Congress, also containing data on religious persecution, that it has collected from U.S. embassies around the world in collaboration with the Office of International Religious Freedom and other relevant U.S. government and non-governmental institutions. The data is listed by country and is available here:  report

Africa

There are 54 countries in Africa with many, but not all, experiencing some type of religious persecution.

Algeria

In Algeria, the official religion is Sunni Islam, and "those engaged in religious practice other than Sunni Islam, including Ahmadi Muslims, reported they had experienced threats and intolerance. The police charged five Christians from Bouira Province with 'inciting a Muslim to change his religion' and 'performing religious worship in an unauthorized place.' In March 2018 a court in Tiaret convicted and fined two Christian brothers for carrying more than 50 Bibles in their car. In May another court convicted a church leader and another Christian of proselytizing, sentenced them to three months in prison, and fined them 100,000 dinars. Authorities closed eight churches and a nursery associated with the Protestant Church of Algeria (EPA). Media outlets reported vandalism of two Christian cemeteries." Algeria

Angola

In Angola, about two-fifths of the population is Roman Catholic, two-fifths is Protestant, and some one-tenth adheres to traditional beliefs or other religions. All religious groups are required to register with the government in order to operate legally. In October 2018, the government required all unregistered religious groups to submit registration documents; 94 submitted their files. On 6 November, the government launched a nationwide law enforcement campaign against which included closing down unlicensed associations. The operation closed more than 900 houses of worship, including eight mosques. Angola

Burkina Faso

In Burkina Faso society is religiously diverse with a 60.5% Muslim majority. A number of terrorist groups operated in the country throughout the year of 2018. In April they kidnapped a public schoolteacher in the Sahel Region, because "French is the language of infidels and all education should be conducted in Arabic." In September they burned and vandalized several schools and teachers' houses in the East Region, warning against secular teaching. They kidnapped a Catholic catechist and a Christian pastor in the Sahel Region in May and June. In September unidentified individuals vandalized a Catholic church, removing the heads of religious statues in the southwest area of the country. Burkina Faso

Burundi

Burundi 2018 "laws regulating nonprofit organizations and religious denominations require them to register with the Ministry of the Interior. Religious groups that do not seek or receive registration may face scrutiny, and at times harassment or prosecution, by government officials and ruling party members." Burundi

Cameroon

In Cameroon, Islam, Christianity, and Traditionalist are the three main religions. Religious groups must register with the government but the government has not allowed registrations for eight years. In 2018, religious leaders said security forces killed three clerics, interrupted church services, and prevented people from getting to their places of worship. On 18 January, soldiers reportedly burned down the presbytery of St. Paul's Catholic Church, Kwa-Kwa, Southwest Region. During the year, the government suspended church executives who had been elected by their churches and closed places of worship. Boko Haram attacked civilians, invaded churches, burned churches, killed and kidnapped both Muslims and Christians, and stole and destroyed property including private homes. Unidentified gunmen in the Southwest Region killed a local chief in a church and assassinated a priest. Separatists threatened pastors, kidnapped priests, and sometimes limited Christians' ability to attend services. There were reports that more than 90 students were kidnapped from Presbyterian schools in two incidents in October and November. Cameroon

Central African Republic

In 2018, the Central African Republic is a majority Christian country that is also religiously diverse. In 2018, the government has limited control as the country is mostly controlled by the Christian anti-Balaka and the Muslim ex-Seleka militia forces who occupy territories in the western and northern parts of the country. The police and the gendarmerie (military police) failed to stop or punish killings, physical abuse, religion-based and gender-based violence committed by these militias. Sectarian clashes between the militias and the rest of the population included attacks on churches and mosques and the deaths at those places of worship.

In April and May, a joint government and UN operation to disarm a militia group in Bangui's predominantly Muslim PK5 neighborhood sparked violence. On 1 May, militia gunmen attacked and killed one priest, 26 worshipers, and injured more than 100 civilians. The following day, anti-Balaka elements burned two mosques in Bangui. On 15 November, a suspected ex-Seleka militia group set fire to the Catholic cathedral and an adjoining internally displaced person (IDP) camp in the city of Alindao, killing Bishop Blaise Mada and Reverend Delestin Ngouambango and more than 40 civilians. Central African Republic

Chad

Chad in 2018 is 51-58% Muslim, 40-45% Christian, with small populations of animists and unaffiliated individuals. During the inauguration of the new government, two Christian ministers refused to swear the required oath of office in the name of "Allah"; one minister who refused to take any oath in the name of Allah was immediately fired by President Idriss Deby. Chad

Democratic Republic of the Congo

The Democratic Republic of the Congo is approximately 45 percent Roman Catholic, 40 percent Protestant (including evangelicals), 5 percent Church of Jesus Christ on Earth through the Prophet Simon Kimbangu (Kimbanguist), and 5 percent Muslim. International NGOs, media, and religious organizations have reported that the government subjected religious organizations and leaders, most prominently Catholic, to intimidation, arbitrary arrest, and in some cases violence. Due to the political nature of many of the CLC's activities and practices, however, it is difficult to establish the government's response as being solely based on religious identity. Democratic Republic of the Congo

Egypt

According to official estimates, 90% of the population of Egypt are Muslim, with the majority Sunni, and 8% to 10% Christian. Sunni Islam is the state religion, but the government also officially recognizes Christianity and Judaism and allows their adherents to publicly practice their religion. According to multiple sources, prosecutors arrested a disproportionate number of Christians for 'blasphemy' criticizing religion. On 2 November, armed assailants attacked three buses carrying Christian pilgrims to a monastery in Minya in Upper Egypt, killing seven and wounding 19. There were also attacks on Christians and Christian-owned property, as well as on churches in the Upper Egypt region. On 26 May, seven Christians were injured in the village of Shoqaf while defending a church from attack by Muslim villagers. Egypt

Eritrea

The population of Eritrea is equally divided between the predominantly Christian high plateau (Asmara), and the Muslim lowlands and coast. The government recognizes four officially registered religious groups: the Eritrean Orthodox Church, Sunni Islam, the Roman Catholic Church, and the Evangelical Lutheran Church of Eritrea. Unregistered groups can be subjected to additional security service scrutiny. The government appoints the heads of the Eritrean Orthodox Church and the Sunni Islamic community. International NGOs and media reported that members of all religious groups were subjected to government abuses and restrictions. Members of unrecognized religious groups reported instances of imprisonment and deaths in custody, and detention without explanation. NGOs reported the government continued to detain 345 church leaders and officials without charge or trial, while estimates of detained laity ranged from 800 to more than 1,000. Authorities detained 53 Jehovah's Witnesses for conscientious objection. Eritrea

Ethiopia

Ethiopia has 43.5% Ethiopian Orthodox Christians, 33.9% Muslim, 18.6%, Protestants, and 2.6% traditional beliefs population. There is also a small Jewish community and some adherents of the Baháʼí Faith. In January 2018, security forces fired tear-gas on a group of youth singing politically charged messages in Woldia town during Epiphany celebrations. The local Human Rights Council (HRCO) reported that security forces shot and killed eight Orthodox Church members; this was followed by further protests and more killings. On 4 August, in the Somali region, an organized group of Muslim youth reportedly killed six priests and burned down at least eight Ethiopian Orthodox churches during widespread civil unrest in Jijiga. On 25 August, in Bure town, followers of the Ethiopian Orthodox Church stoned a man to death after accusing him of attempting to set a church on fire. Ethiopia

Kenya

Kenya in 2018 is religiously diverse: 47.4% of the total population are varieties of Protestant, 20.6% are Roman Catholic, 11.1 percent are Islamic, and 16% are Baháʼí, Buddhist, Hindu and traditional religionists. Kenya also has the highest number of Quakers of any country in the world, with around 119,285 members. The Eastern Orthodox Church has over 650,000 members making it the third largest Orthodox Church in Sub-Saharan Africa. The Somalia-based terrorist group Harakat al-Shabaab al-Mujahideen (al-Shabaab) carried out attacks in Mandera, Wajir, Garissa, and Lamu Counties saying they had targeted non-Muslims. In September, al-Shabaab reportedly stopped a bus in Lamu County and killed two Christian travelers. In October a group of residents in Bungale, Magarini Sub County, burned and demolished a Good News International Ministries church. There were reports of religiously motivated threats, such as members of Muslim communities threatening individuals who converted from Islam to Christianity. According to religious leaders, some Muslim youths vandalized properties of local Christians. Kenya

Libya

Sunni Islam is the state religion and sharia is the principal source of legislation. Non-Muslim activity remains curtailed by legal prohibitions. Circulation of non-Islamic religious materials, missionary activity, or speech considered "offensive to Muslims" is prohibited. Multiple international human rights organizations said Christians faced a heightened risk of physical assault, including sexual assault and rape than other migrants and refugees at government detention centers. Some detainees reported they were tortured and abused. Domestic human rights activists continued to report a restrictive environment, especially toward women, imposing restrictions on women's dress and movement and punishing men for behavior they deemed un-Islamic. The East operated under a separate, unrecognized governmental administration, with security provided by the "Libyan National Army" (LNA) and LNA-aligned Salafist armed groups. Militias continued to operate and control territory throughout the country, including in Benghazi, parts of Tripoli, and Derna, where there were numerous reports of armed groups restricting religious practices, enforcing compliance with sharia, and targeting those viewed as violating their standards. According to Open Doors USA, Islamic militant groups and organized crime groups targeted religious minorities, including Christian migrants, converts to Christianity, and foreign residents for physical attacks, sexual assaults, detentions, kidnappings, and killings. Foreign terrorist organizations that included Ansar al-Sharia, al-Qaida in the Maghreb (AQIM), and ISIS continued to operate within the country. In December the Reuters news service reported local authorities said they had exhumed from a mass grave near Sirte the bodies of 34 Ethiopian Christians executed by ISIS in 2015. According to international media, former Muslims faced intense social and economic pressure to renounce their Christian faith and return to Islam. Libya

Sudan

Some interpretations of Muslim law in Sudan refuse to recognize conversions out of Islam, considering apostacy a crime, and refuse to recognize marriages to non-Muslims. Sudan is one of the nations where being a Christian is hardest in the world. Freedom of religion and belief are systematically violated.

Americas

Bolivia 

The Bolivian government has been criticized for not adequately protecting the rights of religious minorities, including Christians, and for failing to prosecute those responsible for attacks. There have been incidents of property damage and theft directed towards Christian organizations and individuals. The country also has a history of religious tolerance and diversity, and many Christians live and worship freely without incident.

Canada

In 2021, Christian churches in Canada were subject to numerous acts of arson and vandalism that resulted in the damage and destruction of 68 churches across the country.  

Harsha Walia, the executive director of the British Columbia Civil Liberties Association responded to reports of fires at indigenous Catholic parishes with a tweet on June30 that read "burn it all down". The Union of British Columbia Indian Chiefs expressed support for her without mentioning the controversial tweet.

Chile

Since 2015, twelve churches have been burned in southern Chile, 10 Catholic ones and two Protestant ones. Attacks were supposedly from the Mapuche indigenous people, who are campaigning to reclaim ancestral lands, according to authorities.

A note declaring "We are going to burn all churches" was found at the ruins of the Christian Union Evangelical church in Ercilla, Chile, after an arson attack on 31 March 2016.

Cuba

In Cuba, government regulations are aimed at curbing the growth of Christian house churches.

Mexico

Mexico is 83% Catholic, 5% Protestant, with some indigenous persons adhering to indigenous beliefs, 0.5% Jewish and an even smaller number of Muslims and others. In March, authorities in San Miguel Chiptic, Chiapas State, threatened three indigenous families for converting from Catholicism to the Seventh-day Adventist Church and did significant damage to their properties. On 23 May, local police in San Miguel Chiptic arrested two Seventh-day Adventist men for preaching beliefs other than Catholicism. Evangelical Protestant leaders in the states of Chiapas and Oaxaca said local indigenous leaders pressured them to financially support and/or participate in Catholic events, convert or return to Catholicism. In September Christian Solidarity Worldwide reported representatives from Rancheria Yocnajab, located in the Comitan de Dominguez municipality of Chiapas, did not allow the burial of an evangelical Protestant in the community public cemetery because she had not done so. The Catholic Multimedia Center reported that unidentified individuals killed seven priests and kidnapped another. In most cases, attacks on and killings of Catholic priests generally reflect criminal activity rather than religious persecution. In August, the CMC asserted that Mexico was the most violent country for priests in Latin America for the 10th year in a row. In March unidentified individuals detonated two homemade bombs in two Catholic churches in Matamoros, Tamaulipas. Christian Solidarity Worldwide reported unidentified individuals killed four non-Catholic clergy.

Asia

China

In the Xi Jinping era, some estimates put the number of Christians in China at 100 million, but it has been claimed in 2019 that 20 million of them faced persecution, including crackdowns, raids and church closures. Claims of persecution of Chinese Christians occurred in both official and unsanctioned churches.

India
There have been instances of religious intolerance and persecution of Christians in India, particularly in certain areas of the country. In recent years, there have been reports of violence and discrimination against Christians, as well as forced conversions, mainly by Hindu nationalist groups. The Indian government has been criticized by some international human rights organizations and religious groups for not doing enough to protect the rights of religious minorities, including Christians.

Indonesia
Indonesia is the world's largest Muslim-majority country, and while the constitution guarantees freedom of religion, there have been instances of religious intolerance and persecution of religious minorities, including Christians. In some areas of the country, particularly in more conservative regions, local laws and regulations have been used to restrict the religious freedom of minority groups. Additionally, there have been incidents of violence and intimidation directed at religious minorities, including Christians, by extremist groups. However, the overall situation varies widely across the country, with some areas being relatively peaceful while others experience significant religious tension.

North Korea

The government of North Korea is officially atheist, and any religious practices are strictly controlled and heavily monitored by the state. Those who are found to be practicing Christianity or any other religion can face severe punishment, including imprisonment, torture, and execution. The government also actively seeks to root out and punish individuals who are suspected of being involved in underground Christian activities. The country is considered as one of the worst places in the world for religious freedom by several human rights and Christian organizations.

Pakistan

Christians in Pakistan are a minority, making up 1.6% of the population, and religious minorities are frequently discriminated against. The Pakistan blasphemy law mandates that blasphemy of the Qur'an is to be punished. Critics of the laws say that Christians like Asia Bibi are sentenced to death with only hearsay for evidence of alleged blasphemy. At least a dozen Christians have been given death sentences, and half a dozen of them have been murdered after being accused of violating blasphemy laws. In 2005, 80 Christians were behind bars due to these laws.

Christians in Pakistan have been murdered in outbreaks of communal violence, such as the 2009 Gojra riots, and they have been targeted by militant groups, with the Peshawar church attack killing 75 Christians in Peshawar in 2013, and the Lahore church bombings killing 15 Christians in 2015. The campaign of violence by the Tehrik-i-Taliban Pakistan has been described as a genocide.

Sri Lanka

Christians in Sri Lanka are a minority, making up around 7.4% of the population as of the 2011 census. The Christian population faces sporadic outbreaks of violence and hostility by extremists. Churches have been vandalized by mobs organized by supporters of religious nationalist groups, such as Hindu supporters of Rashtriya Swayamsevak Sangh, Buddhist supporters of Bodu Bala Sena and Islamist supporters of National Thowheeth Jama'ath.

Middle East

Former Lebanese president Amine Gemayel stated in 2011 that Christians had become the target of genocide after dozens of Christians were killed in deadly attacks in Egypt and Iraq.

According to Israeli ambassador to the United States Michael Oren, in the hundred years leading up to 2010 the Middle East's Christian population dwindled from 20% to less than 5%. Oren argues that with the exception of Israel, Christians in the Middle East have endured severe political and cultural hardships: in Egypt, Muslim extremists have subjected Coptic Christians to beatings and massacres, resulting in the exodus of 200,000 Copts from their homes; in Iraq, 1,000 Christians were killed in Baghdad between the years 2003 and 2012 and 70 churches in the country were burned; in Iran, converts to Christianity face the death penalty and in 2012 Pastor Yousef Nadarkhani was sentenced to death; in Saudi Arabia, private Christian prayer is against the law; in the Gaza Strip, half of the Palestinian Christian population has fled since Hamas seized power in 2007 and Gazan law forbids public displays of crucifixes; in the West Bank, the Christian population has been reduced from 15% to less than 2%.

Egypt

In Egypt, the government does not recognize religious conversions from Islam to Christianity. Foreign missionaries are allowed in the country if they restrict their activities to social improvements and refrain from proselytizing. The Coptic Pope Shenouda III was internally exiled in 1981 by President Anwar Sadat, who then chose five Coptic bishops and asked them to choose a new pope. They refused, and in 1985 President Hosni Mubarak restored Pope Shenouda III, who had been accused of fomenting interconfessional strife. Particularly in Upper Egypt, the rise in extremist Islamist groups such as the Gama'at Islamiya during the 1980s was accompanied by increased attacks on Copts and on Coptic Orthodox churches; these have since declined with the decline of those organizations, but still continue. The police have been accused of siding with the attackers in some of these cases.

In April 2006, one person was killed and twelve injured in simultaneous knife attacks on three Coptic Orthodox churches in Alexandria.

Since the overthrow of Hosni Mubarak in 2011, Egypt's Coptic Christians have been the target of increasing opposition and discrimination. In 2011, anti-Christian activity in Egypt included church burnings, protests against the appointment of a Coptic Christian governor in Qena, and deadly confrontations with the Egyptian army. On television Islamists referred to Christians as heretics and said they should be made to pay the jizya tax. A Coptic priest accused Islamists in the country of massacring uninfected pigs predominantly owned by Copts during a swine flu scare: "They killed these innocent pigs just because they thought they violated their religion in some way." In October 2011 a draft resolution passed by the European Parliament accused Egypt of persecuting the country's Christian population. By mid-2012 10,000 Christians had fled the country.

In July 2012, Dahshur's entire Christian community, which some estimate to be as many as a hundred families, fled to nearby towns due to sectarian violence. The violence began in a dispute over a badly ironed shirt, which in turn escalated into a fight in which a Christian burned a Muslim to death, which in turn sparked a rampage by angry Muslims, while the police failed to act. At least 16 homes and properties of Christians were pillaged, some were torched, and a church was damaged during the violence.

From 2011 to 2013, more than 150 kidnappings, for ransom, of Christians had been reported in the Minya governorate. 

There is a long-running tension between Christians and Muslims in areas like Minya over whether churches may appear in the village. It is possible, legally speaking, for Christians to get a permit for built churches. However, civilian mobs are liable to attack the building if one's house is thought of as an unlicensed or not-yet-licensed church, or if one is thought to be building a new church. Some Muslim villagers see churches as unclean.

In 2016, Egyptian poet Fatima Naoot was convicted of "contempt of religion" and sentenced to three years in jail for a 2014 Facebook post criticising animal killing during Eid. Four Coptic Christian juveniles were convicted of "contempt of religion" the next month, with three of them sentenced to five years in prison.

Iraq and Syria

The consolidation of power in the hands of Shiite Islamists in Iraq since the overthrow of the Saddam Hussein regime has been to the detriment of Iraq's Assyrian and Armenian Christian communities. Friction between rival sects in Iraq has frequently resulted in violence being directed against Christians in the country. Consequently, there has been a flight of Christians from some areas to Europe and to the United States. Since 2003, hundreds of thousands of Christians have fled Iraq, such that the Christian population, which may have been as high as 1.4 million prior to the Iraq War, has dropped to 500,000, with numbers continuing to decline. Between 2003 and 2012 more than 70 churches were bombed. In 2007 Al Qaeda militants killed a young priest in Mosul, and in 2010 gunmen massacred 53 Assyrian Christians in a Baghdad church.

During the Syrian Civil War and the spillover into Iraq, persecution of Christians by ISIL and other militant groups has been ongoing. The Fall of Mosul and the Assyrian town of Qaraqosh in the 2014 ISIL advance in Iraq led to an estimated 100,000 Assyrian Christian civilians being displaced. After the fall of Mosul, ISIL demanded Assyrian Christians in the city to convert to Islam, pay tribute, or face execution. ISIL begun marking homes of Christian residents with the letter nūn for Nassarah ("Christian"). Thousands of Christians, Yazidis (the latter whom were given only the choice of conversion or death) and other, mostly Shi'a Muslims (whom ISIL consider to be apostates) have abandoned their homes and land. The destruction of cultural heritage by ISIL has included the Mosque of the Prophet Jonah, revered in all Abrahamic faiths.

Israel

In Jerusalem, there have been instances of Christian churches and monasteries being vandalized with spray-painted offensive remarks against Christianity, including death threats. These are believed to be price tag attacks by extremist settlers.

In Tel Aviv in 2008, three teenagers burned hundreds of Christian Bibles.

A number of Ultra-Orthodox/Haredi youth have reportedly spat at Christian clergymen. Archbishop Aris Shirvanian, of Jerusalem's Armenian Patriarchate, says he personally has been spat at about 50 times in the past 12 years. The Anti-Defamation League has called on the chief Rabbis to speak out against the interfaith assaults. Father Goosan, Chief Dragoman of the Armenian Patriarchate of Jerusalem, stated that, "I know there are fanatical Haredi groups that don't represent the general public but it's still enraging. It all begins with education. It's the responsibility of these men's yeshiva heads to teach them not to behave this way". 

In January 2010, Christian leaders, Israeli Foreign ministry staff, representatives of the Jerusalem municipality and the Haredi community met to discuss inter-faith tolerance. The Haredi Community Tribunal of Justice published a statement condemning harassment of Christians, stating that it was a "desecration of God's name". Several events were planned in 2010 by the Orthodox Yedidya congregation to show solidarity with Christians and improve relations between the Haredi and Christian communities of Jerusalem.

In July 2012, a former member of the Knesset, Michael Ben-Ari, who supports Kahanism, videotaped himself tearing up a copy of the New Testament and throwing it in the trash. Ben-Ari referred to it as a "despicable book" that should be "in the dustbin of history". In response, the American Jewish Committee urged the Knesset to censure Ben-Ari, while a spokesman for Benjamin Netanyahu also condemned Ben-Ari's actions.

Palestine

Palestinian Media Watch (PMW) reported that state-controlled Palestinian media frequently demonize religions like Judaism and Christianity. PMW translated into English a children's television program aired twice in 2012 it said featured a young girl saying Jews and Christians are "cowardly and despised".

West Bank
In 2002, a mob of Palestinian Muslims burned Christian property in Ramallah. A dossier submitted in 2005 to Church leaders in Jerusalem listed 93 incidents of abuse alleged to have been committed against Palestinian Christians by Muslim extremists and 140 cases of gangs allegedly stealing Christian land in the West Bank. In May 2012 a group of 100 Muslims attacked Taybeh, a Christian village in the West Bank.

Gaza
In 2007, the Gaza Strip had a tiny Christian minority of 2,500–3,000. The Hamas overthrow of the Palestinian Authority in Gaza during that year was accompanied by violent attacks against Christians and Christian holy sites by Islamic militants. A Catholic convent and Rosary Sisters school were ransacked, with some Christians blaming Hamas for the attack. In September 2007 Christian anxiety grew after an 80-year-old Christian woman was attacked in her Gaza home by a masked man who robbed her and called her an infidel. That attack was followed less than a month later by a deadly assault on the owner of the only Christian bookstore in Gaza City. Muslim extremists were implicated as being behind the incident. The library of YMCA was bombed in 2008 by gunmen who, according to guards at the site, asked why the guards worked for "infidels".

In 2011, the Christian population of Gaza Strip was less than 1,400. A member of the Catholic faith told The Guardian he was stopped by a Hamas official and told to remove a wooden crucifix he was wearing.

Saudi Arabia

The human rights advocacy group International Christian Concern (ICC) told the Christian Post that 35 Christian Ethiopians – men and women – were violently arrested in Jeddah in December 2011 while holding a prayer meeting in their home. The prisoners complained of being persecuted on account of their faith and of being pressured to convert to Islam, and the women reported undergoing a humiliating strip search. According to the ICC, one prisoner said, "The Muslim preacher [that was sent by officials to speak to the prisoners] vilified Christianity, denigrated the Bible and told us that Islam is the only true religion."

Europe

Norway

In June 1992, the Fantoft Stave Church was burnt down. It was a wooden church originally built in 1150 in Fortun and moved to Bergen in 1883. At first the fire was attributed to lightning and electrical failure. In January 1993 Varg Vikernes, also known as "Count Grishnackh", was interviewed by a local journalist in his apartment decorated with 'Nazi paraphernalia, weapons and Satanic symbols'. Vikernes, at the time a proponent of White nationalism, social conservatism, survivalism and his völkisch-inspired ideology, declared that he wanted to blow up Blitz House and Nidaros Cathedral. He has publicly supported black metal fans burning down eight churches in Norway. He used a photo of the charred remnants of one church taken soon after the fire on his band Burzum's EP entitled Aske (Norwegian for ashes). Following his statement, the Norwegian authorities began to clamp down on black metal musicians.

In 1994, Vikernes was found guilty of murder, arson and possession of illegal weapons, including explosives, and given the maximum sentence under Norwegian law of 21 years in prison. He was released in 2009.

The following is a partial list of Norwegian Christian church arsons in 1992 by anti-Christian groups reported by English-language media sources:
23 May 1992: Storetveit Church in Bergen.
1 August: Revheim Church in Stavanger.
21 August: Holmenkollen Chapel in Oslo.
1 September: Ormøya Church in Oslo.
13 September: Skjold Church in Vindafjord. Varg Vikernes and Samoth were convicted for this.
October: Hauketo Church in Oslo.
24 December: Åsane Church in Bergen. Varg Vikernes and musician Jørn Inge Tunsberg were convicted for this.
25 December: a Methodist church in Sarpsborg. A firefighter was killed while fighting this fire.

Russia 
Many attacks, arsons and acts of vandalism against churches in Russia are reported each year. The acts of vandalism are often accompanied by Satanic symbolism and graffiti. In many instances, icons and crosses are burned and vandalized, and swastikas and Satanic symbols are painted on the walls of churches (while other attacks on churches in Russia are simply robberies). Some of the attacks on the churches, such as the cutting down of crosses, appear to be conducted by groups organized online and by local youth.

See also 

Anti-clericalism
Anti-Catholicism
Anti-Protestantism
Anti-Mormonism
Christmas controversy
Religious violence

Related topics

Anti-Judaism
Antisemitism
Christianity and violence
History of Christian thought on persecution and tolerance
Islamophobia
Persecution of Christians by Christians
Persecution of Christians
Persecution of Eastern Orthodox Christians
Persecution of Hazara people
Persecution of Jehovah's Witnesses
Sectarian violence among Christians

References

External links 
US Commission on International Religious Freedom

20th-century Christianity
21st-century Christianity
Aftermath of the Cold War
Contemporary history
Persecution of Christians